Robert Walter Stewart (1812–1887) was a Scottish minister of the Free Church of Scotland and who spent much time working in Italy and served as Moderator of the General Assembly 1874/75. He helped to promote the Waldensian Church and the Presbyterian movement in northern Italy. He was also a travel writer and early photographer.

Being independently wealthy he frequently detached himself from his religious duties for extended holidays. However, he was a noted philanthropist and put both time and money into the promotion of the Presbyterian Church in Italy.

Life

He was born in Bolton, East Lothian, on 29 February 1812. He was the oldest son of Andrew Stewart, and the Hon Margaret Stuart, only daughter of Alexander Stuart, the 10th Lord Blantyre. The family moved to Rome in 1829 and Robert became fluent in Italian as a result.

He was returned to Scotland to study theology at Glasgow University, spending one term also in both Edinburgh University and the University of Geneva. He was licensed to preach in 1830 and spent time assisting at Greenock.

He was ordained by the Church of Scotland at his father's church in Erskine in 1837. He appears to have had a constant yearning to be in Italy, and made frequent trips there on grounds of ill-health, his ministerial duties at Erskine being then fulfilled by his assistant. At the point of the Disruption of 1843 that is to say the General Assembly of the Church of Scotland in the summer of 1843, he was in Malta where he had been for at least six months. He had also spent some time in Constantinople where he met Rev Dr Carl Schwartz. Having had prior warning of the likely importance of the meeting, he set off on a return journey (by ship) immediately on hearing the news. He arrived in Edinburgh on 23 May in time for the Assembly, and is one of the 470 signatures on the Act of Separation.

In 1844 he returned to Italy and settled in Leghorn, where he ran the Bethel Scots Church and the Harbour Mission. In Italy he founded several Presbyterian churches, mainly aimed at serving the needs of British tourists (and sailors), therefore focussed on the major seaside towns and the larger cities. He worked closely with the Waldensian Church at promoting their own expansion. During the establishment of the Tuscan Constitution in 1848/49 he strongly supported the cause and spoke at Lucca and Livorno. In 1849 he relocated to serve the Free Church in Florence. In 1849 he founded a Scots Church in Livorno. He recruited Bartolomeo Malan and Paulo Geymonat to run the church as sympathetic local people.

Princeton University awarded him an honorary doctorate (DD) in 1849.

In 1853 he began an extended tour of the Middle East which lasted four years. On his return in 1857 he helped to establish churches at Piedmont and in Sardinia. In 1860 he placed Pastor Giovanni Ribetti in the Livorno church. In 1871 he bought the entire library of Luigi Desanctis and gifted it to the Livorno library. He further increased this in 1877 when he purchased 900 bibles owned by Tito Chiesi and gifted these to the library.

During this trip (and in his Italian travels) he took many photographs and these represent an early record of these areas.

In the summer of 1874 he made a rare return to Scotland, specifically to serve as Moderator of the General Assembly to the Free Church of Scotland, in succession to Rev Alexander Duff.

In 1883 he was present at the inauguration of the Waldesian Church in Rome, for which he had purchased and gifted the site in 1870 with the aim of increasing the number of Presbyterian students in Rome.

He died in Livorno on 23 November 1887. He is buried there in the English Cemetery.

The Harbour Mission in Livorno was rebuilt as the Seamens Mission in 1913.

Family
He  married  3  September  1839, Graham (sic) (died  30  June  1897),  daughter of Henry Cockburn, Lord Cockburn  and Elizabeth  Macdowall,  and  had  issue — 
Henry Cockburn,  C.M.G.,  administrator,  Seychelles, born  21  July  1840,  died  5  June 1899
Margaret  Catherine,  born  16  April 1842,  died  4  December  1913
Elizabeth  Georgina  Frances,  born  26  July  1844  (married  29 March  1865,  the  Rev.  James  Collie),  died 23  July  1908
Charles  Francis,  born  at Leghorn,  2  October   1846,  died  22 July 1847
Robert  Walter,  born  26  April  1848, died  14  July  1849
Alexander  David, born  19  September  1852,  died  13  March 1899
Walter  Charles  (twin),  born  19 September  1852,  died  23 July  1908
Louisa Caroline  Graham,  born  19  November  1855 (married  1883,  James  Wood  Brown,  M.A.,  minister of  the  Free  Church,  Gordon,  Berwickshire).

Legacy
Addressing  the  General  Assembly of  1869,  Signor  Prochet  said  :  "You  claim Dr  Stewart  as  one  of  yourselves,  bone  of your  bone  and  flesh  of  your  flesh,  and  you may  well  do  so,  because  in  the  land  in which  he  has  been  living  for  thirty  years, he  has  taught  not  only  the  Protestants  but the  Roman  Catholics  to  respect  and  esteem 
Scotland  and  Scottish  Protestants.  But, if  you  claim  him  as  yours,  we  also  claim him  as  being  ours.  He  has  not  been  thirty years  by  our  side,  if  not  to  become  part  of us.  It  is  true,  I  have  no  parchment  to show  to  you  with  the  name  of  Dr  Stewart saying  that  he  has  become  a  citizen  of  the Waldensian  Alps.  But,  if  ever  you  come to  those  valleys,  I  will  show  you  20,000 living  hearts  upon  which  his  name  is written  in  characters  that  can  never  be blotted  out."

Publications

Commentary on the Four Gospels (in Italian)
Religion in Southern Europe
On the Present Condition of the Waldensian Church (1845)
The Tent and the Khan (1857)
La Rivista Cristiana (1871)
Evangelical Work on the Continent of Europe (1876)

References
Citations

Sources

1812 births
1887 deaths
People from East Lothian
19th-century Ministers of the Free Church of Scotland
Scottish photographers
Scottish philanthropists
Livorno
19th-century British philanthropists